Su Su Sudhi Vathmeekam, sometimes stylized as Su.. Su... Sudhi Vathmeekam, is a 2015 Malayalam comedy-drama film directed, co-written and co-produced by Ranjith Sankar. The film stars Jayasurya in a lead role, who also co-produced the film under Dreams N Beyond. Vinod Illampally has done the cinematography and Bijibal has composed the score and soundtrack. The screenplay was written by Ranjith Sankar and Abhayakumar. The central character is inspired from a real-life person Sudheendran Avittathur. The film released on 11 November 2015 on the occasion of Diwali to positive reviews. Jayasurya won national and Kerala state special jury award for his performance.

Plot
The story is the journey of Sudhi Valmeekam (Jayasurya) who struggles with
stammering from his childhood.

The movie starts in Bangalore city where a middle aged Sudhi is serving as the branch manager of Karur Vysya Bank. He comes to the branch on a Sunday to check the making of a movie which stars Mukesh (himself) and Greagon (Aju Varghese). Greagon turns out to be Sudhi's old friend. Sudhi is expected to take the overnight bus to Kerala after the shoot. The shooting of the movie takes up more time than expected leading Sudhi to miss his bus. Sudhi gets tagged with Mukesh to reach his hometown.

On the way Mukesh warms up to Sudhi after an initial tussle. Sudhi narrates his troubles in childhood and youth caused by stammering. A younger Sudhi in his twenties is an office staff in a school where the administrator, Kuruppu (Irshad) is abusive to him. He has a group of friends including Greagon, the physical education teacher. Sudhi is close to Sreedevi (Muthumani), the school principal and her deaf and mute daughter, Tara. His parents are very supportive, but is concerned about Sudhi's stammering. Sudhi lacks confidence and every day activities becomes nightmares as he struggles to speak up when required. Sudhi is undergoing therapy from a holistic Doctor (Sunil Sukhada) whose methods are questionable and is not effective.

Sudhi meets Sheela (Swathy Narayanan) for a marriage alliance and they both like each other. Sheela appears to understand and accept Sudhi's condition. However, with some incidents during the engagement and afterwards, Sheela becomes uncomfortable with the condition. She takes Sudhi to a speech therapist, Kalyani (Sshivada) who categorically states that there is no cure for stammering and Sudhi has to learn to accept it. Sheela breaks off the engagement. This leads Sudhi into a deep depression and he stops going to the school for a while.

Back in school, the owner of the school Vijay Babu (Anson Paul) arrives and he is working with the staff to achieve ISO certification for the school. Sudhi meets Kalyani again who joined as a temporary communication teacher. Sudhi is angry at Kalyani to starts with, but Kalyani manages to convince Sudhi to accept Stammering as an incurable condition which can be managed. They grow close and Kalyani proposes to Sudhi which he rejects as he states that he will be working to become someone worthy to marry Kalyani. Kalyani leaves for Bangalore.

Trouble breaks at school when Sreedevi discovers that administrator Kuruppu has been swindling money using Sudhi from the school. Before she goes to Police, Kuruppu manages to get her arrested on the same charges. On Sreedevi's absence Sudhi takes care of Tara. Kuruppu threatens Sudhi not to reveal the truth. Sudhi musters the courage to go to the Police with documents implicating Kuruppu and releasing Sreedevi. At the end of it Sudhi quits the job at school.

The incident gives Sudhi the confidence to explore the world outside. He studies hard, secures interviews and finally lands a job with Karur Vysya Bank at Bangalore. When he gets promoted as assistant manager through hard work, he meets Kalyani and proposes to her.

Mukesh and Sudhi arrives at Sudhi's home town. Mukesh meets with the characters in Sudhi's story and learns Sudhi has married Kalyani and the school is felicitating Tara and Sudhi. Mukesh leaves happily for his next shooting and Sudhi rekindles with his hometown.

Cast 
 Jayasurya as Sudhi Vathmeekam / Sudhi
 Sshivada as Kalyani, a Speech Therapist
 Mukesh as himself
 Aju Varghese as Greagon 
 Anson Paul as Vijay babu 
 Muthumani as Sreedevi, School Principal
 Arjun Nandhakumar as Mohan
 Irshad as Kurup
 TG Ravi as Sudhi's father
 K. P. A. C. Lalitha as Sudhi's mother
 Sarath Das
 Sunil Sukhada as Holistic Doctor
 Ranjith Sankar as film director (cameo)
 Sathi Premji as Kalyani's Grandmother
 Suja Menon as Nirmala
 Swathy Narayanan as Sheela
 Tara Ranjith Sankar as Junior Tara Menon
 Roshni Singh as Senior Tara Menon
 Advaith Jayasurya as Sudhi in Childhood
 Gokulan as Mukesh's Assistant

Production
The film initial planning began in 2010, the director then announced this project was going to be his next one after his film Arjunan Saakshi. But, the film materialized after the director's fifth film Varsham, he announced it would star Jayasurya as the titular role, who had earlier worked with him in his film Punyalan Agarbattis in which he had co-produced. The film began shooting in the summer of 2015 and was released on 20 November 2015. The filming began in August 2015 in Bangalore. The crew shot in various locations including Erode, Coimbatore, Alathur and Palakkad. Ranjith Sankar wrote on his blog that this was a film he wanted to make for a long time. Jayasurya and Ranjith last teamed up for Punyalan Agarbattis.

Box office 
The film was both commercial and critical success. It earned  within 18 days of initial release.

Soundtrack

The film's background score and songs are composed by Bijibal. Lyrics for the songs are written by Santhosh Varma. P Jayachandran, Swetha Mohan and Ganesh Sundaram are the principal singers. The music was released through the label Muzik 247.

Awards
National Film Awards
National Film Award – Special Mention (actor) - Jayasurya

Kerala State Film Awards
Kerala State Film Award – Special Jury Award - Jayasurya

References

External links 
 

2015 films
2010s Malayalam-language films
2015 comedy-drama films
Indian comedy-drama films
Films shot in Bangalore
Films shot in Coimbatore
Films shot in Palakkad
Stuttering
Films directed by Ranjith Sankar